Rokhsaneh Ghawam-Shahidi (born 12 March 1983) is an English actress. She is known for portraying the role of Leyla Harding in ITV soap Emmerdale.

Career

Theatre 
Shahidi began her career as part of Contact Young Actors Company in 2004 and went on to work for Peskar Productions as a drama workshop leader in Oldham and Bolton. Her theatre credits include East is East, Janus (for West Yorkshire Playhouse), Christie Malry's Own Double Entry at the Palace Theatre, Manchester, Freshly Scratched (for the Battersea Arts Centre) and Rafta, Rafta... at the National Theatre.

She has also acted in radio plays, e.g. Nadeem Aslam's Maps for Lost Lovers. From November 2012 through to January 2013 she played the role of Shahrazad in the Manchester Library Theatre Company performances of Arabian Nights at the Lowry Theatre in Salford, near Manchester.

Television 
Shahidi has appeared on British television in shows such as Sinchronicity and Emmerdale, playing the part of Leyla Harding from 2008 to 2011. Shahidi returned to Emmerdale on 25 December 2013.

Personal life
Ghawam-Shahidi was born to an Iranian father and an English mother, and grew up in Whalley Range in Manchester. She became a vegetarian at the age of 8, and a vegan since the age of 21. She is married to Arsher Ali. They have one child together born in 2018.

Shahidi has set up a Yoga Lunch Club in the Creative Quarter in Hockley, Greater Nottingham where she also is based. She also has a YouTube channel to share yoga videos.

Awards and nominations

References

External links
 

Living people
1983 births
British actresses of Asian descent
English television actresses
English stage actresses
English radio actresses
Actresses from Manchester
English people of Iranian descent
English soap opera actresses